Aphyle affinis is a moth of the family Erebidae first described by Walter Rothschild in 1909. It is found in the upper Amazon basin and Peru.

References

Moths described in 1909
Phaegopterina
Moths of South America